w00t is the eighth studio album by Bob Ostertag, self-released on October 15, 2007.

Reception
TheStreet.com gave w00t a positive review, saying "shards of sounds are recombined here to create original musical phrases -- more like a mosaic than a collage" and "the features of the sampled sounds are recognizable, even as the sounds are turned from their intended purpose -- elevated, the way words are elevated into poetry."

Track listing

Personnel
Adapted from the w00t liner notes.

Musicians
 Bob Ostertag – sampler

Production and design
 John Cooney – cover art

Release history

References

External links 
 w00t at Bandcamp
 

2007 albums
Bob Ostertag albums
Sound collage albums